Gabriel Moore (1785 – August 6, 1844) was a Democratic-Republican, later Jacksonian and National Republican politician and fifth governor of the U.S. state of Alabama (1829–1831).

Life and politics
Moore was born in Stokes County, North Carolina, of English descent and some French descent. He moved to Huntsville, Alabama, in 1810. Moore served in the territorial legislatures and was elected to the United States Congress in 1821. He was re-elected to the United States Congress in 1827.

Moore was the second Representative of the state of Alabama and the first Representative of its First Congressional District.

He served one term as representative of the at-large district of Alabama (1821–1823). Moore was one of four candidates in the running. Moore won with 67.57% of the vote. He served as Alabama's 1st district representative (1823–1829). In the 1823 election, he was the only candidate and won all 3,304 votes. In the 1825 election, he was one of two candidates, the other being Clement Comer Clay. Moore won with 71.12% of the vote.

He was elected Governor of Alabama unopposed in 1829, standing as a Jacksonian. In 1831, two years into his four-year governorship, Moore resigned to seek a Class 3 spot in the Senate. In response to his resignation, Moore was replaced as Governor by Alabama Senate President Samuel B. Moore (no relation).

Moore's Senate bid was successful, and he served for six years as Class 3 Senator alongside William R. King before losing out to John McKinley in 1837, who had preceded Moore in 1831. During his tenure in the Senate, Moore also served as chairman of the House Committee on Revolutionary Claims. Following his loss to McKinley, Moore moved near Caddo Lake, Texas, in 1843. He died there on August 6, 1844, and was buried on the plantation of Peter Swanson.

References

Sources

A New Nation Votes

1785 births
1844 deaths
People from Stokes County, North Carolina
American people of English descent
Democratic-Republican Party members of the United States House of Representatives from Alabama
Jacksonian members of the United States House of Representatives from Alabama
Jacksonian United States senators from Alabama
National Republican Party United States senators from Alabama
Democratic Party governors of Alabama
Jacksonian state governors of the United States
Members of the Alabama Territorial Legislature
Democratic Party Alabama state senators